The Williams F107 (company designation WR19) is a small turbofan engine made by Williams International. The F107 was designed to propel cruise missiles. It has been used as the powerplant for the AGM-86 ALCM, and BGM-109 Tomahawk, as well as the experimental Williams X-Jet flying platform.

Applications
 AGM-86 ALCM
 BGM-109 Tomahawk
 AGM-158 JASSM
 Kaman KSA-100 SAVER
 Williams X-Jet
 Bell Aerospace Flying Jet Belt
 Dynetics Gremlins X-61

Specifications (WR19)

F122

The Williams International F122 is a twin-shaft, axial-centrifugal-flow turbofan that is similar to the F107 in configuration but has a maximum thrust of 900 lbf (3.33 to 4.0 kN).

Design and development
The F122 is used to power the KEPD 350 air-launched cruise missile, and was the powerplant for the cancelled AGM-137 TSSAM air-launched cruise missile. Although the AGM-137 was cancelled, the F122 was first used for the Taurus KEPD when it was flown aboard that missile in April 2002.

Applications
 AGM-137 TSSAM
 KEPD 350

See also
 List of aircraft engines

References

Further reading

External links

 National Museum of the USAF F107 fact sheet
 F107-WR-400_Turbofan_PCS_-_October_1984

Low-bypass turbofan engines
1970s turbofan engines
F107
Centrifugal-flow turbojet engines